The 2008 NCAA Division I Tennis Championships were the 62nd annual men's and 26th annual women's championships to determine the national champions of NCAA Division I men's and women's singles, doubles, and team collegiate tennis in the United States.

The tournaments were played concurrently during May 2008 in Tulsa, Oklahoma.

Defending team champions Georgia defeated Texas in the men's championship, 4–2, to claim the Bulldogs' sixth team national title.

UCLA defeated California in the women's championship, 4–0, to claim the Bruins' first team national title.

Host sites
This year's tournaments were played at the Michael D. Case Tennis Center at the University of Tulsa in Tulsa, Oklahoma.

See also
NCAA Division II Tennis Championships (Men, Women)
NCAA Division III Tennis Championships (Men, Women)

References

External links
List of NCAA Men's Tennis Champions
List of NCAA Women's Tennis Champions

NCAA Division I tennis championships
NCAA Division I Tennis Championships
NCAA Division I Tennis Championships
NCAA Division I Tennis Championships
Tennis in Oklahoma